Mutilate is Angerfist's second studio album. It is a 2-CD album.

Track listing

Disc 1

Disc 2

Notes
 Bite Yo Style samples Eminem's song Just Don't Give A Fuck
 In A Million Years samples Eminem's song White America
 Back Up and Essential Components sample the movie Cube
 Criminally Insane samples the Rammstein song Sonne
 Close To You samples the movie The Shining
 Strangle and Mutilate describes Gary Heidnik and Edmund Kemper.

External links
 Mutilate at Discogs

2008 albums
Angerfist albums